Somewhere in Berlin is a film produced in the Soviet occupation zone of Allied-occupied Germany, the area that later became East Germany. It was released in 1946, and was the third DEFA film. It sold 4,179,651 tickets. It was part of the group of rubble films made in the aftermath of the Second World War.

Cast
 Harry Hindemith – Iller
 Hedda Sarnow – Frau Iller
  – Gustav Iller
 Hans Trinkhaus – Willi, sein Freund
 Siegfried Utecht – „Kapitän“
 Hans Leibelt – Eckmann
 Paul Bildt – Birke
 Fritz Rasp – Waldemar
 Walter Bluhm – Onkel Kale
  – Frau Steidel

Plot
A group of children play bravely in the ruins of Berlin after World War II.  One boy's father comes home from a POW camp.  The boy is saddened by his father, who is a hopeless, powerless man, but the children eventually give the father fresh hope by persuading him to clean up his badly bomb-damaged garage.

References

Bibliography
 Shandley, Robert. Rubble Films: German Cinema in the Shadow of the Third Reich. Temple University Press, 2010.

External links
 

1946 films
East German films
1940s German-language films
Films set in Berlin
Films directed by Gerhard Lamprecht
German children's films
German black-and-white films
German drama films
1946 drama films
1940s German films